Razino is a rural locality (a selo) in Tsvetnovsky Selsoviet of Volodarsky District, Astrakhan Oblast, Russia. The population was 23 as of 2010. There is 1 street.

Geography 
Razino is located 30 km southeast of Volodarsky (the district's administrative centre) by road. Tsvetnoye is the nearest rural locality.

References 

Rural localities in Volodarsky District, Astrakhan Oblast